The 1942 German Ice Hockey Championship was the 26th season of the German Ice Hockey Championship, the national championship of Germany. 12 teams participated in the first round. The championship was abandoned after the first round, and no champion was declared..

First round

Group A

Group B

Group C

Group D

References

External links
German ice hockey standings 1933-1945

Ger
German Ice Hockey Championship seasons
Champion